Tuchkov may refer to:
Tuchkov Bridge, a bridge in Saint Petersburg, Russia
Yevgeny Tuchkov (1892–1957), head of the anti-religious arm of the Soviet secret police